Adam de Givenchi (fl. 1230–1268) was a trouvère, probably from Givenchy and active in and around Arras. His surname is also spelled Givenci, Gevanche, or Gievenci.

Adam appears in charters of May and July 1230 as a clerk of the Bishop of Arras. He was still serving in the household of the bishop in 1232. In 1243 he was named as a priest and chaplain to the bishop. In 1245 he was the doyen of Lens.

In Arras he associated with the poets Simon d’Authie, Pierre de Corbie, Guillaume Le Vinier, and Jehan Bretel. He wrote one jeu parti with each of the last two, and the composition with Guillaume (Amis Guillaume, ainc si sage ne vi) has several surviving melodies. Six other poems survive to his name, four with melodies. Two of these are chansons avec des refrains. All the songs are in AAB form and the melodies are simple.

Songs with music
Amis Guillaume, ainc si sage ne vi, jeu parti
Assés plus que d’estre amés, chansons avec des refrains (no music for refrains)
Mar vi loial voloir et jalousie
Pour li servir en bone foi, chansons avec des refrains
Si com fortune d’amour

Notes

References
Parker, Ian R. "Adam de Givenchi." Grove Music Online. Oxford Music Online. Accessed 20 September 2008.

Trouvères
13th-century French people
Male classical composers